Xylophanes huloti is a moth of the  family Sphingidae. It is known from Ecuador.

References

huloti
Moths described in 2008
Endemic fauna of Ecuador
Moths of South America